The 1904 University of New Mexico football team was an American football team that represented the University of Dayton as an independent during the 1904 college football season. In its second and final season under head coach Walter McEwan, the team compiled a 1–0 record.

Schedule

References

University of New Mexico
New Mexico Lobos football seasons
College football undefeated seasons
University of New Mexico football